María Corina Smith Pocaterra (born 8 September 1991) better known as Corina Smith, is a Venezuelan singer, actress and model.

Personal life 
Corina Smith was born in the city of Caracas, Venezuela, on 8 September 1991. She is the daughter of Roberto Smith Perera, leader of the Venezuelan opposition party Popular Will and Marina Pocaterra. Corina Smith studied economics and finance at the Bentley University, in the United States, until 2014, when she returned to Venezuela.

Smith has two sisters, María Sofía Smith and María Elisa Smith.

Career 
Smith debuted on television in 2009, participating in the television series, Somos tú y yo: Un nuevo día, playing Maria Corina, a cheerleader of the Granadillo Academy. The series is a spin-off of Somos tú y yo. The series was premiered on 17 August 2009 by the Boomerang Latin American channel.

In 2010, Smith joined the main cast of the series, NPS: No puede ser. The series is the second spin-off of Somos tú y yo and marks the closing of the series, the series premiered for the first time 25 July 2010 in Venezuela by Venevisión and on 8 November 2010 by the Boomerang Latin American channel.

Career as a singer 
In 2015, she debuted as a singer with a promotional single, "La Difícil", from which she recorded a video clip in La Guaira, Venezuela, with the participation of Sheryl Rubio, Rosmeri Marval, Rosangelica Piscitelli, Natalia Moretti and Vanessa Suárez.

In May 2016, she released her second single, "Vitamina D", The single is part of the singer's first album. In September 2016, she released her third single "Escape" along with Venezuelan singer Gustavo Elis. The video clip was produced by Nael and Justin, who on other occasions have worked with artists such as Jonathan Moly and Illegales. In December 2016, she released her fourth single "Ahora o Nunca".

In June 2017, she was invited to present a prize in the Heat Latin Music Awards, made by the HTV music channel. In August 2017, she traveled to Ecuador as part of the disc promotion and was the opening act of the singer Daddy Yankee in Guayaquil. In September 2017, Corina presented her new single "Completa". The video was under the production of Nael and Justin. The single quickly managed to position itself at the top of Record Report and as a result of the success obtained, it was the image of important brands in Venezuela.

In February 2018, Smith presents her new single, "Montaña Rusa". The video was under the production of Nael and Justin. In July 2018, she released the single "Más". The video was under the production of Nael and Justin. In September 2018, she released the single "Cantante" with the collaboration of the Venezuelan singers Neutro Shorty and Big Soto. The song was under the production of the music companies Rimas Music and Trap Money. In December 2018, she released the single "Este año". The song was under the production of the musical company DLS Music.

In January 2019, she released the single "Mientras Tanto". The video was directed by Jose Bueno. In February 2019, she released the single "Fondo de Pantalla". The song was under the production of the musical company DLS Music. In April 2019 she released her single "Se te nota".

In 2020 were released a lot of singles and collaborations, some of them are "A Veces", "Dejame Llevarte" with Nibal, "Te Voy a Extrañar" with Lyanno, “Por Fin” and “Un Día Mas”. 

In 2021 were released the singles "Obviamente" and the others three singles that will be included in her first Debut EP; “A Veces”, “GPS” and “Roto”. 

In March 2022, was released her first EP called “Antisocial".

Filmography

Discography

Extended Plays

Singles 

 "La Difícil" (2015)
 "Vitamina D" (2016)
 "Escape" (2016)
 "Ahora o Nunca" (2016)
 "Completa" (2017)
 "Montaña Rusa" (2018)
 "Más" (2018)
 "Soy Para Mi" (2018)
 "Cantante" with Neutro Shorty and Big Soto (2018)
 "Este Año" (2018)
 "Mientras Tanto" (2019)
 "FDP" [Fondo de pantalla] (2019)
 "Se te nota" (2019)
 "No Somos Nada" with Kevin Roldan (2020) 
 "Pasatiempo" with Alex Rose (2020)
 "Dejame Llevarte" with Nibal (2020)
 "A Veces" (2020)
 "Te Voy a Extrañar" with Lyanno (2020)
 "Aunque Me Lo Niegues" with Amenazzy (2020)
 "Morir Juntos" with Lenny Tavarez (2020)
 "Drama" with Alvaro Diaz (2020)
 "Por fin " (2020)
 "Navisad” (2020)
 "Un Día Mas” with Akapellah (2020)
 "Obviamente" (2021)
 "GPS” with Noriel (2021)
 "A Veces” with Arcangel (2021)
 "Roto" with Eladio Carrion (2022)
 "Antisocial" (2022)

Collaborations 

 "Novios" with Gustavo Elis (2017)
 "VIP" with Gaby Noya and Vanessa Suárez (2017)
 "Vamos bien” with various artist (2019)
 "Repetirlo" with Nael y Justin (2019)
 "Solas" with Vanessa Suarez (2020)
 "Que Fluya (Remix)” with Yera, Jerry Di, Andy G
 "Suave" with Matt Hunter (2020) 
 "Todo o Nada" with Eladio Carrion (2021)

References

External links 
 
 
 
 

Venezuelan telenovela actresses
21st-century Venezuelan actresses
Venezuelan female models
1991 births
People from Caracas
Living people